St. Thomas Aquinas High School is a private, Roman Catholic, college-preparatory high school in Fort Lauderdale, Florida, United States. The school was founded in 1936 as part of St. Anthony School and moved to its current location in southwest Fort Lauderdale in 1952. It is sponsored by the Roman Catholic Archdiocese of Miami and accredited by the Southern Association of Colleges and Schools. The school currently enrolls 2,028 students on its  campus.

The Raiders athletic teams have won over 100 state championships and have achieved a national profile. Graduates of St. Thomas Aquinas include numerous professional athletes, thirteen
Olympians, prominent state politicians, and award-winning authors and actors.

History
St. Anthony High School was founded by the Dominican Sisters of Adrian, Michigan in 1926. The upper school was added in 1936 and grew to a student body of 42 in four years, boasting nine graduates who comprised the Class of 1940.

The upper school was renamed Central Catholic High School and moved to its present location in 1952. The original Central Catholic campus consisted of the main office wing, library, 15 classrooms, patio, cafeteria, kitchen, coaches’ office, and locker room facilities. The school erected a statue of Mary in 1957 that still graces the campus today.

In September 1961, due to the opening of Cardinal Gibbons High School, a second Catholic school in Fort Lauderdale, the school chose St. Thomas Aquinas as its patron and official name.

Academics
On May 29, 1996, President Bill Clinton presented St. Thomas Aquinas High School with the Department of Education Blue Ribbon Award for excellence in education. This was the second time St. Thomas Aquinas received recognition by the U.S. Department of Education. During the 1984-1985 school year, the school was first recognized as a "School of Excellence".

St. Thomas Aquinas High School has been named to the Catholic High School Honor Roll five times (2004, 2005, 2006, 2007 and 2010). It is the only Catholic high school in the Archdiocese of Miami to have been listed as one of the Top 50 Catholic high schools in the United States for five years.

Admissions
St. Thomas Aquinas accepts students from 105 feeder schools, 46 Catholic parishes, and three counties. An entrance exam is required for all incoming Freshmen. Prospective students must submit their first semester 8th grade report card and two letters of recommendation from their current school. Prospective transfer students must submit an application along with a copy of their current high school transcript and two academic letters of recommendation from current school officials.

Faculty and curriculum
The St. Thomas Aquinas faculty consists of three religious and 127 laypersons, with 74 teachers holding advanced degrees. The ratio of students to teaching faculty stands at 17 to 1. The faculty averages 20 years of teaching experience and 12 years of experience at the school.

The school offers 195 different courses in 9 subjects: English, Mathematics, Physical Education, Science, Social Studies, Foreign Language, Fine Arts, Computer/Graphic Arts, and Theology. Students are grouped by ability with course offerings at Advance Placement, Honors and College-Preparatory levels.

Athletics
In 2005, St. Thomas Aquinas was recognized by Sports Illustrated as the third best high school athletic program in the nation. The criteria emphasized all-around excellence during the last 10 years and included state championships won and the number of college athletes produced.

In 2011, St. Thomas Aquinas was named the nation's top athletic program by Maxpreps.

The Raiders have won 115 FHSAA state championships and have graduated such student athletes as Chris Evert, Michael Irvin and Sanya Richards-Ross. The school has been awarded the Broward County all-sports trophy by the Sun-Sentinel for 35 consecutive years. The athletic department has also won the FHSAA Dodge Sunshine Cup every year since the awards inception in 1995.

State championships

Boys
 Baseball - 1995, 2003, 2018
 Basketball - 2001
 Cross Country - 2013, 2015, 2016
 Football - 1992, 1997, 1999, 2007, 2008, 2010, 2012, 2014, 2015, 2016, 2019, 2020, 2021, 2022
 Lacrosse - 2016, 2017, 2022
 Soccer - 1996, 1997, 1998, 2005, 2011
 Swimming - 1993, 1997, 1998, 1999, 2000, 2001, 2002, 2003, 2004
 Tennis - 1989, 1994, 2009
 Track and Field - 2008, 2009, 2010, 2011, 2012, 2014
 Water Polo - 2013
 Wrestling - 1985

Girls
 Basketball - 2021, 2022
 Cross Country - 2012, 2013
 Golf - 1982, 1983, 1984, 1985, 2001
 Lacrosse - 2021
 Soccer - 1990, 1993, 1994, 1995, 1996, 1997, 1998, 1999, 2004, 2005, 2011, 2012, 2014, 2015, 2017
 Softball - 2002, 2003, 2013, 2014
 Swimming - 1994, 1995, 1996, 1997, 1998, 1999, 2000, 2001, 2002, 2004
 Tennis - 1972, 1985, 1986, 1993, 1994, 1995, 1996, 2003, 2004, 2007, 2008, 2022
 Track and Field - 1998, 1999, 2000, 2001, 2002, 2003, 2004, 2005, 2013, 2014, 2015, 2018, 2019, 2021
 Volleyball - 1995, 2004, 2014, 2015, 2016, 2018

Notable alumni

Athletics

Foluke Akinradewo, professional volleyball player and gold medalist at 2020 Summer Olympics
Damon Arnette, former professional football player
Carlos Asuaje, professional baseball player
Geno Atkins, former professional football player and 8-time Pro Bowler
Alejandro Bedoya professional soccer player for Philadelphia Union & formerly the US national team
Giovani Bernard, professional football player for Tampa Bay Buccaneers
Joey Bosa, professional football player and 3-time Pro Bowler for Los Angeles Chargers
Nick Bosa, professional football player and Pro Bowler for San Francisco 49ers
Bobby Brown, former professional football player
Curt Brown, former professional baseball player 
Duron Carter, professional football player
Joe Castiglione, athletic director at University of Oklahoma
Jeremy Cain, former professional football player
Stephen Cardullo, professional baseball player for Colorado Rockies
Audra Cohen, former professional tennis player and 2007 NCAA women's singles champion
John Congemi, former professional football player and college football analyst for ESPN
Bryan Cox Jr., professional football player for Buffalo Bills
James Crawford, professional football player for Baltimore Ravens
Andrew Datko, professional football player for the Green Bay Packers
Marco Dawson, professional golfer and winner of 2015 Senior British Open
Phillip Dorsett, professional football player for the Houston Texans and Super Bowl Champion
Jason Dufner, professional golfer and winner of 2013 PGA Championship
Eric Eichmann, former professional soccer player and member of U.S. Men's National Team at 1990 FIFA World Cup
Kendall Ellis, Olympian and gold medalist in 4×400m relay at 2020 Summer Olympics
Chris Evert, former professional tennis player and member of International Tennis Hall of Fame
Jeanne Evert, former professional tennis player
Sean Gallagher, former professional baseball player
Marcus Gilbert, former professional football player
Tavares Gooden, former professional football player
Richard Goodman, former professional football player
Rashad Greene, former professional football player
Tyler Greene, former professional baseball player
Trevon Grimes, former professional football player
Arman Hall, Olympian and gold medalist in 4×400m relay at 2016 Summer Olympics
Leonard Hankerson, former professional football player and wide receivers coach for San Francisco 49ers
Mike Harley Jr., professional football player for Cleveland Browns
Stefan Humphries, former professional football player and Super Bowl Champion
Michael Irvin, former professional football player and member of Pro Football Hall of Fame
Lamarcus Joyner, professional football player for New York Jets
Sarah Lihan, Olympian who placed 9th in women's sailing 470 at 2012 Summer Olympics
Brandon Linder, professional football player for Jacksonville Jaguars
Mark Merklein, former professional tennis player and 1994 NCAA men's singles champion
Chad Mottola, former professional baseball player and hitting coach for the Tampa Bay Rays
Gene Monahan, former head athletic trainer for New York Yankees
Elijah Moore, professional football player for the New York Jets
Ed Nelson, former professional basketball player
Kirsten Nieuwendam, Olympian who competed in 400m Hurdles at 2008 Summer Olympics and 2012 Summer Olympics
Kirk Olivadotti, assistant coach for Green Bay Packers
Michael Palardy, professional football player for Miami Dolphins
Josh Palmer, professional football player for the Los Angeles Chargers
Sterling Palmer, former professional football player
Brian Piccolo, former professional football player, inspiration for film Brian's Song
Vladislav Polyakov, Olympian and gold medalist in 200m Breaststroke at 2006 FINA World Championships
Daryl Porter, former professional football player
Sanya Richards-Ross, Olympian and gold medalist in women's 400m at 2012 Summer Olympics
Cody Riggs, former professional football player
Shawn Riggans, former professional baseball player
Jake Rudock, former professional football player
Twan Russell, former professional football player and Director of Youth and Community Programs for Miami Dolphins
Asante Samuel Jr., professional football player for the Los Angeles Chargers
Tony Sands, former professional football player
Khalifa St. Fort, Olympian and gold medalist in 4×100m relay at 2015 World Championships
Nate Salley, former professional football player
Robby Scott, professional baseball player for Arizona Diamondbacks
Dezmen Southward, former professional football player
Mike Stanley, former professional baseball player and 1995 American League All-Star
Tyler Steen, football player
Seilala Sua, Olympian who placed 10th in discus at 2000 Summer Olympics
India Trotter, former professional soccer player and member of U.S. Women's National Team
Dallas Turner, football player
Major Wright, former professional football player
James White, former professional football player for New England Patriots and 3-time Super Bowl Champion
Ed Yarnall, former professional baseball player
Sam Young, former professional football player

Arts, entertainment, and civil service
Michael Connelly, author of The Lincoln Lawyer and former President of Mystery Writers of America
Steven Conrad, screenwriter and producer of The Weather Man, The Secret Life of Walter Mitty, and The Pursuit of Happyness
Billy Crudup, actor Tony Award and Emmy Award winner
 Marcos Gonzalez, comedian and television writer for NBC.
Alex Andrade, member of Florida House of Representatives
Katie Edwards, former member of Florida House of Representatives
Parris Glendening, former Governor of Maryland
Charles Liteky, former Army chaplain and Medal of Honor recipient
Courtney Marsh, filmmaker of Academy Award-nominated documentary Chau, Beyond the Lines
Alberto Rosende, actor and singer who appeared in the Freeform supernatural drama Shadowhunters
C. Dale Young, poet and recipient of 2012 Guggenheim Fellowship
William J. Zloch, U.S. District Court Judge for the Southern District of Florida
Anya Marino, first transgender woman of color to teach at Harvard Law School and constitutional and civil rights lawyer

Other 

 Gerard John Schaefer, murderer and suspected serial killer, known as "the Killer Cop"

References

External links
Official School Website

Educational institutions established in 1936
Catholic secondary schools in Florida
High schools in Fort Lauderdale, Florida
Schools accredited by the Southern Association of Colleges and Schools
 
1936 establishments in Florida